The 2012 World Under-17 Hockey Challenge was an ice hockey tournament held in Windsor, Tecumseh and La Salle,  Ontario, Canada, between December 29, 2011, and January 4, 2012.  The World Under-17 Hockey Challenge is held by Hockey Canada annually to showcase young hockey talent from across Canada and other strong hockey countries.  The primary venues used for the tournament were the WCFU Centre in Windsor, Tecumseh Arena in Tecumseh and the Vollmer Culture and Rec Centre in La Salle.

Challenge results

Preliminary round

Group A

Results

Group B

Results

Final round

* Decided in overtime.
** Decided in a shootout

Semifinals

9th place game

7th place game

5th place game

Bronze medal game

Gold medal game

Scoring leaders

Goaltending leaders
(Minimum 60 minutes played)

Final standings

Tournament All-Star Team
Goaltender:  Nikita Serebryakov
Defencemen:  Gage Ausmus,  Ontario Darnell Nurse
Forwards:  J. T. Compher,  Victor Öhman,  Sergey Tolchinsky

See also
World U-17 Hockey Challenge
2012 IIHF World U18 Championships
2012 World Junior Ice Hockey Championships

References

External links

World U-17 Hockey Challenge
U-17
U-17
U-17
U-17
U-17
U-17
Ice hockey competitions in Toronto
International ice hockey competitions hosted by Canada